Melissa Tang (born May 7, 1985) is an American actress.

Early life and education 
Tang was born in Los Angeles, California, and is of Chinese descent. 

She graduated with a BFA in acting from Carnegie Mellon University in 2007.

Career 
She has guest starred in The Big Bang Theory, Mom, The Unit, Lie to Me, CSI: Crime Scene Investigation, Harry's Law, Good Luck Charlie, New Girl and Baby Daddy. She has also appeared in the films Beginners (2010) and the internet film Inside (2011).

She co-starred as April Cho in the Fox sitcom The Goodwin Games, which premiered in May 2013.

Filmography

References

External links

1985 births
21st-century American actresses
Actresses from Los Angeles
American actresses of Chinese descent
American film actresses
American television actresses
Living people